Tail to Nose: Great Championship, known in Japan as , is a 1989 Formula One-based arcade racing video game developed and published by Video System.

Summary
Super Formula was one of the earliest arcade games related to Formula 1, in this case the 1988 season. Although being an unlicensed game, the teams, drivers, sponsors and the only four circuits available were inspired by real-life ones. The drivers are recognizable in the graphic representations of their faces.

It can be considered as the predecessor to the F-1 Grand Prix (video game series).

Constructors and drivers

Selectable
  Lotos Homda (Lotus Honda, main sponsor Camel)
  2 -  S. Nakaji (Satoru Nakajima)
  1 -  N. Poquet (Nelson Piquet)
  McLarun Homda (McLaren Honda, main sponsor Marlboro)
 11 -  A. Prist (Alain Prost)
 12 -  A. Seena (Ayrton Senna)
  Ferreri (Ferrari)
 28 -  G. Burger (Gerhard Berger)
 27 -  M. Albert (Michele Alboreto)
  Willarms Jadd (Williams Judd, main sponsor Canon)
  5 -  N. Manuel (Nigel Mansell)
  6 -  R. Patric (Riccardo Patrese)
  Benetten Foad (Benetton Ford)
 20 -  T. Boozen (Thierry Boutsen)
 19 -  A. Nanine (Alessandro Nannini)
  Marci Jadd (March Judd, main sponsor Leyton House)
 16 -  I. Capela (Ivan Capelli)
 15 -  M. Gugmin (Maurício Gugelmin)

The "Lotos Homda", "McLarun Homda" and "Ferreri" are 1500cc turbocharged cars
The "Willarms Jadd", "Benetten Foad" and "Marci Jadd" are 3500cc non-turbocharged cars

Other drivers
  3 -  J. Palmen (Jonathan Palmer, Tyrrell)
  4 -  J. Barley (Julian Bailey, Tyrrell)
  9 -  P. Ginzan (Piercarlo Ghinzani, Zakspeed)
 10 -  B. Snider (Bernd Schneider, Zakspeed)
 17 -  D. Wavick (Derek Warwick, Arrows)
 18 -  E. Cheer (Eddie Cheever, Arrows)
 23 -  P. Martea (Pierluigi Martini, Minardi)
 24 -  L. Sola (Luis Pérez-Sala, Minardi)
 25 -  R. Arneut (René Arnoux, Ligier)
 26 -  S. Jonson (Stefan Johansson, Ligier)
 29 -  A. Susuki (Aguri Suzuki, Larrousse)
 30 -  P. Arliot (Philippe Alliot, Larrousse)
 32 -  O. Lauren (Oscar Larrauri, EuroBrun)
 33 -  S. Modela (Stefano Modena, EuroBrun)
(26 drivers)

Circuits
  Silverstone
  Suzuka
  Detroit
  Montecarlo

References

External links
 Tail to Nose: Great Championship at Arcade-history

1989 video games
Arcade video games
Arcade-only video games
Formula One video games
Video System games
Video games developed in Japan
Video games scored by Naoki Itamura
Video games set in 1988